Shanghai Interpretation Accreditation is a test aiming at selecting intellectuals skilled on interpretation in the People's Republic of China. The test was organised by Pudong Continuing Education Center of Shanghai Higher Education (PCEC) and is held twice a year, in March and December respectively. Initially launched in June, 1995, there had been a total of 198,200 participants by the autumn of 2004.

External links 
SIA Official Website 

Language interpretation
Education in Shanghai